The 1776 English cricket season was the fifth in which matches have been awarded retrospective first-class cricket status. The scorecards of seven first-class matches have survived. The earliest printed cricket scorecard templates were introduced during 1776.

Matches
Seven first-class match scorecards survive from 1776, all of them involving Hampshire XIs playing either Kent XIs or Surrey XIs.

5–7 June - Hampshire XI v Kent XI - Moulsey Hurst
25–26 June - Kent XI v Hampshire XI - Sevenoaks Vine
2–4 July - Hampshire XI v Kent XI - Broadhalfpenny Down
15–17 July - Kent XI v Hampshire XI - Sevenoaks Vine
22–24 July - Hampshire XI v Kent XI - Broadhalfpenny Down
6–8 August - Surrey XI v Hampshire XI - Laleham Burway
26–28 August - Hampshire XI v Surrey XI - Broadhalfpenny Down

Three other matches not between county sides are known to have been played during the season. Full scorecards do not survive from these matches.

In the 6–8 August Surrey v Hampshire match at Laleham Burway, John Wood and Lumpy Stevens made a last-wicket partnership of 43 to win the match for Surrey. This was the first known one-wicket margin in a first-class match, while Wood and Stevens' newly established record for the highest last-wicket partnership to win stood until 1877, when the Gentlemen added 46 for the last wicket to win the 2–4 July Gentlemen v Players match at Lord's.

Other events
A notice in the Leicester Journal of 17 August is the earliest known mention of cricket in Leicestershire.

First mentions
Richard Aubrey Veck made his debut in first-class cricket during the season.

References

Further reading
 
 
 
 
 

1776 in English cricket
English cricket seasons in the 18th century